Below is a list of squads used in the 1996 African Cup of Nations.

Group A

Head coach:  Clive Barker

Head coach:  Jules-Frederic Nyongha

Head coach:  Ruud Krol

Head coach:  Carlos Alhinho

Group B

Head coach:  Roald Poulsen

Head coach:  Ali Fergani

Head coach:  Idrissa Traore, then  Calixte Zagre for the last match

Head coach:  Roger Palmgren

Group C

Head coach:  Alain da Costa

Head coach:  Muhsin Ertuğral, then  Lusadusu Basilwa for the last two games

Head coach:  Wilfred Lardner

Group D

Head coach:  Ismael Kurtz

Head coach:  Pierre Pleimelding

Head coach:  Henryk Kasperczak

Head coach:  Rui Caçador

References 
[https://web.archive.org/web/20100125034552/http://www.rsssf.com/tables/96a-det.html (RSSSF)

Africa Cup of Nations squads